Georgios Stefanou (born ) is a Greek male volleyball player. He was part of the Greece men's national volleyball team. He competed with the national team at the 2004 Summer Olympics in Athens, Greece. He most notable played for Olympiacos and Panathinaikos.

See also
 Greece at the 2004 Summer Olympics

References

External links
profile at greekvolley.gr
profile at fivb.org

1981 births
Living people
Greek men's volleyball players
Place of birth missing (living people)
Volleyball players at the 2004 Summer Olympics
Olympic volleyball players of Greece
Panathinaikos V.C. players
Olympiacos S.C. players
E.A. Patras players
Iraklis V.C. players
PAOK V.C. players
Volleyball players from Athens